Tsai Pai-sheng (born 14 February 1935) is a Taiwanese sports shooter. He competed at the 1984 Summer Olympics and the 1988 Summer Olympics.

References

1935 births
Living people
Taiwanese male sport shooters
Olympic shooters of Taiwan
Shooters at the 1984 Summer Olympics
Shooters at the 1988 Summer Olympics
Place of birth missing (living people)
Shooters at the 1990 Asian Games
Shooters at the 1994 Asian Games
Asian Games competitors for Chinese Taipei
20th-century Taiwanese people